Iosif Alexandrovich Adamovich ( (Jazep Adamovič), 7 January 1897,Barysaw – 22 April 1937, Minsk) was a Belarusian Soviet politician and statesman. He was born in 1897 in Barysaw, in the Minsk Governorate of the Russian Empire, in a working-class family of Belarusian ethnicity. He served as a Prime Minister of the Byelorussian Soviet Socialist Republic from 1924 to 1927. In 1916, he was a member of the Russian Social Democratic Labour Party, where he was organised the Belarusian Bolsheviks.

In 1920, he was commissioner of military affairs of the Byelorussian Soviet Socialist Republic. From 1924 to 1927, he was the Prime Minister of the Byelorussian Soviet Socialist Republic. He was instrumental in the enlargement of the territory of Soviet Belarus in 1924 and 1926.

On 22 April 1937, he committed suicide in Minsk, aged 40.

Notes

Further reading 
 W. Roszkowski, J. Kofman (red.), Słownik biograficzny Europy Środkowo-Wschodniej XX wieku, Warszawa 2005, 
 E. Mironowicz, Białoruś, Wyd. Trio, Warszawa 2007, 

1897 births
1937 suicides
People from Barysaw
People from Borisovsky Uyezd
Old Bolsheviks
Central Executive Committee of the Soviet Union members
Members of the Central Committee of the Communist Party of Byelorussia
Heads of government of the Byelorussian Soviet Socialist Republic
Frunze Military Academy alumni
Russian military personnel of World War I
Soviet military personnel of the Russian Civil War
Soviet politicians who committed suicide
Belarusian politicians who committed suicide
Suicides in the Soviet Union
1937 deaths